Advanced Perl Programming is a 1997 book by Sriram Srinivasan which covers complex techniques needed in production level Perl.

The second edition, by Simon Cozens and edited by Allison Randal, was published in 2005. It contains a different set of high-level programming techniques intended for practical use, and is described at www.oreilly.com.

Related books include Programming Perl, Perl Cookbook, and Perl Hacks.

Reception
Charles Stross called Advanced Perl Programming sections on networking and object-oriented programming "well-nigh indispensable".  Eric S. Raymond called Sriram Srinivasan's commentary on the Perl language "uniformly intelligent, incisive and tasteful".  Donald Bryson of Network Computing magazine called the book "full of useful information, well written, beautifully set, and technically accurate".

References

External links
 Online Catalog: Advanced Perl Programming, 1st edition
 Chapter One as well as the complete set of code examples in the book.

1997 non-fiction books
2005 non-fiction books
O'Reilly Media books
Books about Perl